Geissanthus pinchinchana is a species of plant in the family Primulaceae. It is endemic to Ecuador.

References

pinchinchana
Endemic flora of Ecuador
Endangered plants
Taxonomy articles created by Polbot